This is a list of Urdu-language television channels in Pakistan, India and the rest of the world.

Pakistan

Entertainment
Aaj Entertainment
AJK TV
A-Plus Entertainment
A-Lite
A-Plus TV
ARY Digital
ARY Digital UK
ARY Zindagi
ATV (Pakistan)
Express Entertainment
Filmazia Entertainment
Geo Kahani
Geo TV
H Now Entertainment 
HTV
Hum Sitaray
Hum TV
Indus Vision
Play Entertainment
PTV Global
PTV Home
PTV World
TVOne Global
Urdu 1

Lifestyle and health
Masala TV
Zaiqa

Music
8XM
8XM Jalwa
ARY Musik

Movies
ARY Films
ARY
Filmazia

News
7 News (Pakistan)
24 News HD
92 News HD Pakistan
Aaj News
Abb Takk News
ARY News
Bol News
Capital TV
Channel 5 (Pakistan)
Dawn News
Din News
Dunya News
Express News (Pakistan)
Geo News
Geo Tez
GTV Network HD
Jaag TV 
Kay2 TV
News One (Pakistani TV channel)
Neo TV
PTV News
SAMAA TV
Such TV
Waqt News
Wesal Urdu.tv

Business
Business Plus (TV Channel)

Regional
City 41 - covering Faisalabad District
City 42 - covering Lahore
Dhoom TV - covering Sindh province
Metro One - covering Karachi 
Rohi (Pakistan) - covering Multan

Religious
Ahlebait TV
ARY Qtv
Behthat TV
Hadi TV
Hidayat TV
Labbaik TV
Madani Channel
Mercy TV
Paigham TV
Pashto Bayan
Peace TV Urdu
Urdu Bayan
MTAinternational (MUSLIM TV AHMADİYYA)

Sports
Geo Super - owned by Geo TV Network
PTV Sports - owned by PTV Network

Children's
Cartoon Network (Pakistani TV channel) (Some programs)
Nickelodeon (Pakistani TV channel) (Some programs)
Pop (Pakistani TV channel)

India

Entertainment
DD Kashir - owned by Doordarshan Network
DD Urdu - owned by Doordarshan Network
Zindagi (TV channel) - owned by Zee Network

News

4TV NEWS - owned by Fame Media Pvt. Ltd.
Aalami Samay - owned by Sahara India Pariwar Group Sahara Network 
Munsif TV - owned by Dera Television Pvt. ltd.
News18 Urdu - owned by ETV Network and Network 18 
Zee Salaam - owned by Zee Media Corporation ltd.

United Kingdom

Religious
Ahlebait TV
Hidayat TV
Madani Channel

Takbeer TV
MTA International

Iran, Azerbaijan, Turkey, Caucasus, Iraq
Hadi TV
Sahar 2

See also
Lists of television channels
List of Indian television stations
List of Pakistani television channels
List of Punjabi-language television channels
Urdu cinema

References

Urdu
Urdu
Urdu language
Television